Jerzy Wyrobek (17 December 1949 – 26 March 2013) was a Polish football player and coach.

Career

Playing career
Jerzy Wyrobek played for Stadion Śląski Chorzów, Zagłębie Wałbrzych, Ruch Chorzów and TuS Schloß Neuhaus. He was also capped 15 times for Poland, scoring one goal.

Coaching career
Jerzy Wyrobek managed Ruch Chorzów, Sokół Tychy, GKS Bełchatów, Odra Wodzisław, Zagłębie Lubin, Pogoń Szczecin, KSZO Ostrowiec Świętokrzyski, Tur Turek, GKS Jastrzębie and Zaglebie Sosnowiec.

References

1949 births
2013 deaths
Polish footballers
Poland international footballers
Ruch Chorzów players
SC Paderborn 07 players
Polish football managers
Ruch Chorzów managers
GKS Tychy managers
GKS Bełchatów managers
Odra Wodzisław Śląski managers
Zagłębie Lubin managers
Pogoń Szczecin managers
KSZO Ostrowiec Świętokrzyski managers
Zagłębie Sosnowiec managers
Sportspeople from Chorzów
Association football defenders
Zagłębie Wałbrzych players
Tur Turek managers